No Balance Palace  is the fifth album by the Danish band Kashmir. It was released on 10 October 2005. The album features a duet between Kasper Eistrup and David Bowie on "The Cynic", and Lou Reed on "Black Building", and was produced by Tony Visconti. The first single was "The Curse of Being a Girl".

The cover art is an abstract painting by El Lissitzky called "Abstract Cabinet" (1927).

Words by Kasper Eistrup. Music by Kasper Eistrup except where noted.

Track listing

Australian Tour Edition bonus tracks:
12. "Supergirl (Demonstrations Skizze)" – 3:57
13. "She's Made of Chalk (Single Revision)" – 4:01

Japan bonus tracks (SICP 1019):
12. "Ding A Ling" – 5:41
13. "Snowman (Organic Draft)" – 2:58
14. "The Dusk Hour (Sidestep Walk)" – 5:15
15. "Supergirl (Demonstrations Skizze)" – 3:58

References

External links
 The video of "The Curse Of Being A Girl"
The video of "The Cynic"

Kashmir (band) albums
Albums produced by Tony Visconti
2005 albums